Puerto Rico Highway 17 (PR-17) is a main highway located in Carolina, San Juan and Guaynabo, Puerto Rico. It begins at PR-20 near its terminus with PR-2, and ends in the Luis Muñoz Marín International Airport in Carolina. It is known as Jesus de Piñero Avenue along its entire length.

Route description
It intersects several important highways and streets in the metro area, including Las Américas Expressway (PR-18), Juan Ponce de León Avenue (PR-25), Trujillo Alto Expressway (PR-181) and PR-8. After the intersection with PR-181, it becomes a very short freeway and part of it is a toll bridge (the longest bridge above water in the island) called the Teodoro Moscoso Bridge, which is tolled with $3.40. After the bridge, it makes a final intersection with Román Baldorioty de Castro Expressway (PR-26) before becoming the road to the airport.

Tolls

Major intersections

See also

 List of highways numbered 17

References

External links
 

017
17